Comparative Literary Studies: An Introduction is a 1973 textbook by Siegbert Salomon Prawer in which the author provides an introduction to comparative literature.

Reception
Alireza Anoushirvani (from Shiraz University) calls the book one of the most authentic books taught in Western universities.
In a review published in AUMLA, Derek P. Scales (from the ANU) writes: "One cannot but be impressed by the range of Professor Prawer's reading, his familiarity with so many works in various literatures which have been the subject of comparative studies, and his awareness of what has been written by so many scholars in the fields designated by his several chapter headings".

References

External links 
Comparative Literary Studies: An Introduction

1973 non-fiction books
English-language books
Literary textbooks
Comparative literature